Sindhi Camp metro station, also known as Utkarsh Sindhi Camp, is a metro station on the Pink Line of the Jaipur Metro. It was opened on 3 June 2015. It connects to Sindhi Camp an inter state bus terminal as well as projected Orange Line of Jaipur Metro

In 1947 at the India-Pakistan partition, this was the first place in Jaipur where Sindhi came from Pakistan and they camp here to stay here. That is why its name is Sindhi Camp.

Station layout

Connections

Entry/Exits

See also

References

External links
 UrbanRail.Net — descriptions of all metro systems in the world, each with a schematic map showing all stations.

2015 establishments in Rajasthan
Jaipur Metro stations